Sigh No More is the second studio album released by German power metal band, Gamma Ray in 1991 by Noise Records. Beginning a trend that would continue until their fifth studio release, the band's lineup changed from the previous album, with Uli Kusch replacing Mathias Burchardt on drums and Dirk Schlächter officially joining the band on guitars.

Track listings

Anniversary Edition bonus disc

"Countdown" does not appear on the vinyl or cassette versions of the album.
"Heroes" is an alternative version of "Changes" and also appears on the Japanese version of Insanity and Genius.
"Dream Healer (pre-production version)" also appears on the Future Madhouse EP.
"Who Do You Think You Are?" also appears on the European version of Heaven Can Wait EP and Who Do You Think You Are? EP.

Personnel
Gamma Ray
 Ralf Scheepers – lead vocals
 Kai Hansen – guitar
 Dirk Schlächter – guitar, keyboards
 Uwe Wessel – bass
 Uli Kusch – drums

Additional musicians
 Tommy Newton – keyboards, additional rhythm guitar on track 5, talk box solo on track 8, backing vocals, producer, engineer, mixing
 Piet Sielck – keyboards, backing vocals, second engineer
 Fritz Randow – military snare on track 6
 Rolf Köhler – backing vocals

Production
 Karl-Ulrich Walterbach – executive producer

Charts

References

1991 albums
Gamma Ray (band) albums
Noise Records albums